Denaun Porter (born December 7, 1974), also known by the stage names Mr. Porter, Kon Artis, and more recently simply Denaun, is an American rapper and music producer. He was a member of Detroit hip hop group D12 until its disbandment in 2018.

He has a close association with rapper Eminem, often appearing on his tours and has produced for a manifold of other notable artists such as 50 Cent, Royce da 5'9", The Game, Method Man, Snoop Dogg, Jadakiss and more.

Career 
Born in North Carolina, Porter moved with his family to Mississippi and later to Detroit when he was 10 years old. His father, Charles, is a gospel singer and former member of The Blind Boys of Alabama and The Christianaires; his mother is a writer.

Porter started his career with D12 in the mid-1990s. He was inspired to rap and produce after hearing A Tribe Called Quest's song, "Bonita Applebum". Mr. Porter was introduced to Eminem by fellow D12 member Eye-Kyu back in 1995. Throughout his solo career, he has both produced and performed vocally as a rapper and singer, producing songs for many notable artists such as Eminem, Busta Rhymes, Snoop Dogg, Royce da 5'9" and 50 Cent (producing the 2003 song "P.I.M.P."). Around this time, Porter worked on the singer Bilal's second album, Love for Sale.

He is also officially signed to Eminem's label Shady Records as a producer and has worked with Shady artists Slaughterhouse, Bad Meets Evil, 50 Cent and D12. Mr. Porter is now most notably seen as a hype man in Eminem's live shows, replacing fellow D12 member Proof who died in 2006.

Porter was a co-executive producer, with Eminem and Royce da 5'9", for Bad Meets Evil's debut EP Hell: The Sequel. He also has a cameo appearance in their music video "Fast Lane", as well as "Forever" by Drake featuring Kanye West, Lil Wayne and Eminem, and Eminem's single "No Love" featuring Lil Wayne and then in 2013 he featured in Eminem's "Rap God" video alongside other members of Slaughterhouse. In 2020 he featured in the music video of Eminem's single "Godzilla".

On April 2, 2012, Porter formally announced that he had left D12. He stated that he wanted to focus on being a solo artist and producer, but clarified that he holds no animosity toward other members of the group. Two years later in late 2014, he rejoined D12 and contributed a verse to the song "Bane" on the Shady Records compilation album, Shady XV, released on November 24, 2014. In January 2015, he appeared on D12's The Devil's Night Mixtape.

Discography

Instrumental albums 
 Porter Chops Glasper (stylized as pOrTeR cHoPs gLaSpEr) (2013)
The Great Depression A.P. (2018)
Letter 2 Sydney (2019)

EPs 
 Stuff in My Backpack (stylized as sTuFf In My BaCkPaCk) (2015)
 Connect (2016)
 While You Wait (2019)

Collaboration albums 

 Devil's Night (with D12) (2001)
 D12 World (with D12) (2004)

Mixtapes 
The Devil's Night Mixtape (with D12) (2015)

Guest appearances

Awards and nominations 

!
|-
|align=center|2002
|The Eminem Show
|Grammy Award for Album of the Year
|
|
|-
|align=center|2010
|Recovery
|Grammy Award for Album of the Year
|
|
|-

References

External links 
 

American hip hop record producers
Midwest hip hop musicians
Eminem
African-American male rappers
Living people
Rappers from Detroit
Shady Records artists
African-American record producers
African-American songwriters
Songwriters from Michigan
D12 members
20th-century American rappers
21st-century American rappers
American rhythm and blues musicians
1974 births